The McKeesport Tubers were an American basketball team based in McKeesport, Pennsylvania that was a member of the Central Basketball League.

Year-by-year

Basketball teams in Pennsylvania